"Desenfocao'" is a song recorded by Puerto Rican singer Rauw Alejandro for his second studio album, Vice Versa (2021). The song was written by Manuel Lara, Rafa Pabón, Kenobi, Colla, Eric Duars, Alejandro, and Tainy, while the production was handled by Lara and Tainy. It was released to Latin American radio stations by Sony Music on August 10, 2021, as the first promotional single from the album. A Spanish language new wave, synth-pop, and funk song, it finds the singer very confused after a relationship breakup, so that he barely even knows where he is.

"Desenfocao'" received widely positive reviews from music critics, who complimented its fusion of genres. The song peaked at number six on Monitor Latino's Honduras pop chart. An accompanying music video, released simultaneously with the song, was filmed as a long take and directed by Alejandro and NINE-D. It depicts the backstage of a concert, where Alejandro parties and enjoys his night right before the show. To promote the song, he performed "Desenfocao'" and "Cúrame" in a special two-song set with Billboard and Honda Stage.

Background and release
Alejandro released his debut studio album, Afrodisíaco, on November 13, 2020. Two weeks after finishing the work on Afrodisíaco, he started working on his second studio album, Vice Versa. The latter was released for digital download and streaming by Sony Music Latin and Duars Entertainment on June 25, 2021, and "Desenfocao'" was included as the ninth track. During an interview with Vice, when he was asked if "Desenfocao'" was chosen as the next single from the album, Alejandro responded:

On August 10, 2021, "Desenfocao'" was released to Latin American radio stations by Sony Music on August 10, 2021, as the first promotional single from the album.

Music and lyrics

Musically, "Desenfocao'" is a Spanish language new wave, synth-pop, and funk song, with elements of disco, pop, EDM, and deep house. The song uses cowbell and runs for a total of 2 minutes and 50 seconds. It was written by Manuel Lara, Rafa Pabón, Kenobi, Colla, Eric Duars, Alejandro, and Tainy, with its production being handled by Lara and Tainy. Lyrically, "Desenfocao'" which translates to "Unfocused" in English, finds the singer very confused after a relationship breakup, so that he barely even knows where he is. The lyrics include, "No sé a adónde voy, nadie sabe nada / Creo que estoy desenfocao' / Jangueando to' los día' / ¿Que salió el sol? No sabía" (I don't know where I'm going, nobody knows anything / I think I'm unfocused / Hanging out every day / When did the sun come up? I didn't know).

Reception
Upon release, "Desenfocao'" was met with widely positive reviews from music critics. Julyssa Lopez from Rolling Stone, ranked the track among Alejandro's 10 Essential Songs, labeling it "One of Vice Versas most interesting peaks". She described the song as "blurry" and called Tainy's production "spacey", stating that it "brings out the song's lysergic wooziness and helps Rauw swerve into unexpected directions". Writing for the same magazine, Lucas Villa highlighted the song as a "stunning standout" from the album and noted its fusion of genres. Also in his review for The Fader, he called it "intoxicating". Billboard critic T.M. Brown labeled it "a shimmering, stadium-ready track that shows off Alejandro's sonic and aesthetic range". Another author of Billboard named it a "hit". USA Today reviewer Pamela Avila described "Desenfocao'" and "La Old Skul" as "up-tempo songs perfect for the summer".

Piet Levy from Milwaukee Journal Sentinel mentioned "Desenfocao'" as a "standout" for Vice Versa, comparing it to The Weeknd's After Hours era: "With its moody synth waves and creamy pulsing beats, the track is like the perfect marriage of the Weeknd's '80s-inspired 'After Hours' era with the more reserved and enigmatic sound from the start of his career." Happy FM staff wrote that Alejandro has managed to leave his audience "speechless" with the release of the song, "that is leaving no one absolutely indifferent". The song peaked at number six on Monitor Latino's Honduras pop chart in August 2021. It later appeared on its respective year-end charts in 2021 and 2022.

Promotion

Music video

An accompanying music video was released simultaneously with the song. The visual was directed by Alejandro and NINE-D. It depicts the backstage of a concert, where Alejandro parties and enjoys his night right before the show. The video was filmed as a long take with a glowing "psychedelic" filter that is "a little dazed and unsteady", as it is suggested by the song's title. In the final scene, the singer appears on the stage and starts singing behind a microphone in front of thousands of attendees.

Live performances
Alejandro gave a live performance of "Desenfocao'" and "Cúrame" in a special two-song set with Billboard and Honda Stage. For the former, he wore a "glossy all-white suit". "Desenfocao'" was also included on the set list for Alejandro's the Vice Versa World Tour.

Credits and personnel
Credits adapted from Tidal.

 Rauw Alejandro associated performer, composer, lyricist
 Manuel Lara composer, lyricist, producer
 Rafael E. Pabon Navedo "Rafa Pabón" composer, lyricist
 Jorge E. Pizarro "Kenobi" composer, lyricist, recording engineer
 José M. Collazo "Colla" composer, lyricist, mastering engineer, mixing engineer
 Eric Pérez Rovira "Eric Duars" composer, lyricist
 Marcos Masís "Tainy" composer, lyricist, producer

Charts

Weekly charts

Year-end charts

Release history

References

2021 songs
2021 singles
Rauw Alejandro songs
Songs written by Rauw Alejandro
Sony Music Latin singles
Spanish-language songs